Living in a Big Way (1947) is an American musical comedy film starring Gene Kelly and Marie McDonald as a couple who marry during World War II after only knowing each other a short time. This was director Gregory La Cava's final film.

Plot 
Leo Gogarty (Kelly) marries Margaud Morgan (McDonald) after a whirlwind romance just before shipping out to war. When he returns, he is surprised to discover not only that his bride is not what she led him to believe, but also that she expects a quick divorce. Both Mr. and Mrs. Gogarty must find their place with or without each other in a society still adjusting to peace.

Among the many Gene Kelly dance segments are 'Fido and Me', where Mr. Kelly dances with a dog and a statue, and a sequence on a construction site with a number of children.

Cast 
 Gene Kelly as Leo Gogarty
 Marie McDonald as Margaud Morgan
 Charles Winninger as D. Rutherford Morgan
 Phyllis Thaxter as Peggy Randall
 Spring Byington as Mrs. Minerva Alsop Morgan
 Jean Adair as Abigail Morgan
 Clinton Sundberg as Everett Hanover Smythe
 John Warburton as 'Skippy' Stuart Simms
 William Phillips as Schultz
 Bernadene Hayes as Dolly
 John Alexander as Attorney Ambridge
 Phyllis Kennedy as Annie Pearl

Reception
The film earned $1,137,000 in the US and Canada and $376,000 elsewhere, resulting in a loss of $1,939,000 - one of MGM's biggest disasters of 1947.

References

External links 
 
 
 

1947 films
1947 musical comedy films
1947 romantic comedy films
American musical comedy films
American romantic comedy films
American romantic musical films
American black-and-white films
Films directed by Gregory La Cava
Metro-Goldwyn-Mayer films
1940s romantic musical films
1940s English-language films
1940s American films